dbx is a source-level debugger found primarily on Solaris, AIX, IRIX, Tru64 UNIX, Linux and BSD operating systems. It provides symbolic debugging for programs written in C, C++, Fortran, Pascal and Java. Useful features include stepping through programs one source line or machine instruction at a time. In addition to simply viewing operation of the program, variables can be manipulated and a wide range of expressions can be evaluated and displayed.

History
dbx was originally developed at University of California, Berkeley, by Mark Linton during the years 1981–1984 and subsequently made its way to various vendors who had licensed BSD.

Availability
Besides being provided to various vendors through BSD, dbx has also found its way into other products:

 dbx is also available on IBM z/OS systems, in the UNIX System Services component. dbx for z/OS can debug programs written in C and C++, and can also perform machine level debugging. As of z/OS V1R5, dbx is able to debug programs using the DWARF debug format. z/OS V1R6 added support for debugging 64-bit programs.
 dbx is included as part of the Oracle Solaris Studio product from Oracle Corporation, and is supported on both Solaris and Linux. It supports programs compiled with the Oracle Solaris Studio compilers and GCC.

See also
 Modular Debugger (mdb)
 GNU Debugger

References

External links
 dbx for z/OS
 dbx for AIX
 Sun Studio Compilers and Tools for Solaris OS and Linux
 Sun Studio 12: Debugging a Program With dbx
 

Debuggers
Unix programming tools